Waterman Township is a township in O'Brien County, Iowa, USA.

History
Waterman Township was founded in 1869. It was named for Hannibal H. Waterman, a pioneer settler.

References

Townships in O'Brien County, Iowa
Townships in Iowa